Rune "Sternklang" Brøndbo (born 2 March 1968 in Norway) is a Norwegian jazz musician (keyboards, guitar) and composer, known for recording with various notable bands including Wibutee and Sternklang. He is the cousin of the DDE drummer Eskil Brøndbo and vocalist Bjarne Brøndbo

Career 
Brøndbo has made himself noticed with his band Sternklang releasing four records within a decade (1997–2006). He also contributes on the two latest albums of Wibutee, Playmachine (2004) and Sweet Mental (2006), with whom he performed at Nattjazz in Bergen (2003 and 2006), the last time featuring Anja Garbarek.

Discography

Solo works 
As Sternklang
 1997: Freestylespacefunk (Beatservice Records)
 1999: Neolounge (Beatservice Records)
 2002: My Time Is Yours
 2006: Transistor Beach

Collaborative works 
Within Rotoscope
 2001: Great Curves (Jester Records)

Within Wibutee
 2004: Playmachine (Jazzland)
 2006: Sweet Mental (Sonne Disk)

References

External links 
 Wibutee website

Musicians from Namsos
Norwegian male singers
Norwegian keyboardists
20th-century Norwegian pianists
21st-century Norwegian pianists
Norwegian jazz pianists
Norwegian musicians
Scandinavian musicians
Norwegian jazz guitarists
Norwegian jazz composers
1968 births
Living people
20th-century guitarists
21st-century Norwegian guitarists
Norwegian male pianists
Male jazz composers
20th-century Norwegian male musicians
21st-century Norwegian male musicians
Wibutee members